Rockbitch was a British, mostly female, lesbian and bisexual metal band, who performed nude and incorporated sexual acts and Pagan rituals into their performances.

History
Rockbitch was originally formed in 1984 as Cat Genetica by bassist Amanda Smith-Skinner ("the Bitch") and guitarist Tony Skinner ("the Beast"). The band was later renamed Red Abyss, in 1989, and drew band members from the matriarchal, polyamorous, pagan, feminist community of which Smith-Skinner was a member.

Musically, Red Abyss drew on jazz, funk and rock influences dominated by singer Julie Worland's Janis Joplin–influenced vocals. In time, their music took on harder punk and metal influences. Red Abyss became Rockbitch with the lineup change of Jo Heeley on drums. The lineup varied over the years to include 'Luci the Stage Slut', 'The Haema-Whore', and Kali and Erzulie—the 'Sex Magik Priestesses'.

The former two were primarily a combination of sexual performance artists and gonzo-camera team, capturing closeups of stage action projected on the wall behind the band while performing. They were also responsible for the cued playing of prepared art videos of subject matter relating to the songs. This included female genital mutilation, eating disorders, body dysmorphia, and menstruation taboos.

The band toured Germany, France, Switzerland, the Netherlands, Sweden, Denmark, the UK (but were banned from venues in Scotland), Italy, Spain, Finland, Slovenia, Czech Republic and Estonia, as well as a promotional tour in Canada.

Rockbitch became infamous not only for performing live sex acts but also doing so with audience members via "The Golden Condom". During their shows, a condom was tossed into the crowd; whoever caught it (male or female) was taken backstage for sexual acts with  band members.

The members of the band lived together as a polyamorous commune in a house in France.

In 1997, Rockbitch made tabloid headlines after they played at a school for pre-teen children, although for this particular concert they changed their name to "Rocky Beaches", wore modest clothes, and sang non-sexual songs.

Rockbitch toured widely from approximately 1998 until 2002, meeting increasing resistance from authorities, particularly English, German and Norwegian town councils who often banned their concerts. The band were often forced to find alternative venues to perform.

After an event in Almelo, Netherlands, TVAmsterdam arranged a concert in Zaandam, recording the experience and adding extra footage to create the documentary "Bitchcraft".

The Rockbitch line-up became entirely female in 2000. Original lead guitarist Tony "The Beast" Skinner retired, taking over management/production. Lisa "Babe" Wills took lead guitar duties, while Luci, previously "Stage Slut" (one of the nude dancers and sexual band/crowd liaisons), took over rhythm guitar.

Babe stated in 2002, "Rockbitch had no problem with lads out for seeing breasts, as they were a component of the audience, there were always others seeing the deeper meaning and both groups had a good time. They generally made up for a great combined atmosphere".

In 2003, the band received a Lifetime Achievement award from the Sexual Freedom Awards.

Activism and philosophy
Members lent their voices to female and sexual issues, were winners of the yearly prize at the Sex Maniacs Ball (now Night of the Senses) founded by Tuppy Owens, openly voiced their admiration for sexual politics icons such as Annie Sprinkle and Betty Dodson, and generally advocated for open female sexuality as a healthy part of human nature. In an extension of the 1970s feminist statement that ‘the personal is the political’, they stated that no feminist movement was complete without female sexuality being re-examined, redefined and expressed in whatever shape it took by women themselves. They saw rock music as the perfect medium to do so, as it had been the arena for the expression of masculine sexuality for so long, whereas women's bodies were often a marketing spice to add interest to a product rather than a source of personal empowerment.

The group described themselves as having a free-love and pansexual communal philosophy.

Dissolution
After the release of its first studio album, Motor Driven Bimbo, Rockbitch were increasingly pressured to censor their stage performances by their record company. They refused and successfully negotiated a release from their contract.

A second, goth-influenced album, titled Psychic Attack, was never released.

The band took care never to break any laws regarding the content of their stage shows in any country or territory. Continued attention from British police about their sexually driven themes and performances combined with local council opposition to their adult-only shows. Underhanded pressure on venue owners regarding liquor and performance licenses resulted in difficulties performing live—even when venue owners were positive towards the band. Tours were booked and then dates pulled with only days to spare. The frustration and problems this created led to Rockbitch ceasing performing live in 2002.

Rockbitch were the subject of many documentaries and featured in many shows. Amongst others, Rockbitch were the subject of a 30-minute documentary on BBC Choice the same year. A further, hour-long documentary was broadcast on Channel 5 in the UK in 2003. Award-winning director Norman Hull made ‘This is Rockbitch’ in 2003. They can still be spotted in repeats of ‘Sexcetera’.

In 2005, the entire latter-day Rockbitch lineup emerged under the name MT-TV. This was a music-only project—no sex or nudity of the Rockbitch days—but it incorporated stage theatrics and provided sociosexual-based political comment through its lyrics.  After a UK tour in summer 2005, they performed throughout the United States. The first part of their US tour was documented on the DVD 'Shevolution', released by Blackwing Films in 2006.

The most recent program, released in 2017, is a Swedish documentary on the rise in popularity of witchcraft and its feminist connections. The first film crew to be allowed access behind the commune walls since the cessation of the Rockbitch live performances, the documentary contains a recap of their musical career, and provides insight into their pagan/witchcraft roots with how it underpinned their music and interviews with Babe.

Amanda and Jo subsequently went on to form the band Syren with singer/songwriter Erin Bennett, who joined the Rockbitch commune in 2006.
In 2012, Jo died of breast cancer. Amanda gave up her musical career shortly after. Erin Bennett subsequently continued as a solo artist with a backing band that contains some ex-members of Rockbitch, discarding the name Syren and performing as Erin Bennett and the EB Band. In the last two years, the band have undergone a complete rebranding and are now touring as a ProgRock band under the name EBB.

Julie, the lead singer of Rockbitch, continues her musical career under the name Krow, creating hard dance music in the style of Noise Terror Punk EDM. Her music and video were also featured in the Swedish documentary.

Personnel

The personnel were as follows: 
 Julie Worland: Vocals
 "Luci": Guitar (from 2000, previously dancer and sex performer)
 Amanda Smith-Skinner ("the Bitch"): bass
 Nikki Fay: piano, flute
 Joanne Heeley (2 November 1972 – 11 January 2012): drums 
 Lisa Wills ("Babe"): lead guitar, backing vocals (also webmistress)
 Tony Skinner ("the Beast"): guitar on Motor Driven Bimbo and producer of both studio albums
 "Chloe": dancer, sex performer
 Suna Dasi ("Kali"): dancer, sex performer
 Martina ("Erzulie"): dancer, sex performer

Discography and videography
Luci's Love Child (as Red Abyss) (1992) (Eurock)
Rockbitch Live In Amsterdam (1997) (Crystal Rock Syndicate – doCD)
Bitchcraft (concert and documentary video, 1997, subsequently released on DVD) not available in countries like USA, Japan
The Bitch O'Clock News (reports and clips video, 1998) made for audiences in USA and Japan
Motor Driven Bimbo (1999) (Steamhammer)
Psychic Attack (unreleased) (2002)
Sex, Death and Magick (concert/documentary video, 2002)
This is Rockbitch (documentary video, 2003)

References

External links

Official website
Rockbitch lyrics

2017 Swedish documentary

1984 establishments in the United Kingdom
All-female bands
Articles containing video clips
Bisexual musicians
British alternative metal musical groups
English gothic metal musical groups
English heavy metal musical groups
Feminist musicians
Free love
British industrial metal musical groups
LGBT culture in the United Kingdom
LGBT-themed musical groups
Modern pagan musical groups
Modern paganism in the United Kingdom
Musical groups established in 1984
Nudity
Polyamorous culture
Sex-positive feminism
Sexuality in the United Kingdom